Annona haematantha is a species of plant in the family Annonaceae. It is native to Brazil, French Guiana, Guyana and Suriname.

Description
It is a woody vine reaching 5 centimeters in diameter. It has climbing habit that becomes horizontal as it reaches the forest canopy. Its membranous, elliptical leaves are 12-15 by 5-7 centimeters and come to a tapering point at their tip. Its leaves have 10-12 pairs of secondary veins emanating from their midribs. Its petioles are 5-6 millimeters and covered in rust-colored hairs.  Its inflorescences have a solitary flower on a 10 millimeter long pedicel that is 1 millimeters in diameter.  It has oval to triangular sepals that are 2-3 millimeters long and covered in dense brown hair.  Its 6 petals are arranged in two rows of 3.  The outer petals are fused to form a tube 5-10 millimeters long by 10 millimeters in diameter, with oval to triangular lobes that are 10-20 by 10-15 millimeters.  The outer petals are yellow to red outside and deep red inside. The inner petals are fused to form a 7 millimeter long tube with 2 millimeter long triangular lobes.

Reproductive biology
The pollen of A. haematantha is shed as permanent tetrads.

Distribution and habitat
It grows in forests and swamp-forests in sandy soil.  It flowers in January.

Uses
Bioactive compounds extracted from the roots have been reported to have antileishmanial properties.

References

External links
 

haematantha
Flora of Brazil
Flora of French Guiana
Flora of Guyana
Flora of Suriname
Species described in 1849
Taxa named by Friedrich Anton Wilhelm Miquel